Carp River may refer to:

Canada
Carp River (Algoma District) in Algoma District, Ontario, which empties into Batchawana Bay on northeastern Lake Superior
Carp River (Ottawa) in the city of Ottawa, Ontario, which empties into the Ottawa River

United States
 One of several Carp Rivers in Michigan including:
 Carp River (Gogebic-Ontonagon counties), in the Porcupine Mountains empties into Lake Superior
 Carp River (Luce County), empties into Lake Superior near the Crisp Point Light
 Carp River (Mackinac County), a federally designated Wild and Scenic River in the Upper Peninsula flowing into St. Martin Bay on Lake Huron
 Carp River (Marquette County), empties into Lake Superior in Marquette
 Leland River, in Leelanau County, formerly known as Carp River
 Waiska River, in Chippewa County, was formerly known as Carp River

See also 
 Carp Lake River, Emmet County, Michigan
 Little Carp River (disambiguation)
 Carp (disambiguation)
 Carp Lake (disambiguation)